Las Numero Uno is a compilation album by Banda El Recodo. The album contains the singles "Me Gusta Todo De Ti" and "Te Pido Perdón (Banda Version)". There are also many other singles from the band.

Standard edition track listing
Me Gusta Todo De Ti - 3:03
Te Presumo — 3:11
Que Bonito — 2:48
La Gran Panchanga — 2:51
Dos Botellas de Mezcal — 3:16
Techno Cumbia — 2:48
Para Toda La Vida — 3:27
Delante de Mi Deténte — 2:33
Deja — 2:37 
Lo Mejor de Mi Vida — 3:57
Tus Palabras — 2:59
No Me Sé Rajar — 2:53
Y Llegaste Tú  — 3:29
Te Pido Perdón (Banda Version) (with Tito "El Bambino")  — 2:52
Yo Se Que Te Acordarás — 3:18

References

2010 compilation albums
Banda el Recodo compilation albums
Fonovisa Records compilation albums
Spanish-language compilation albums